Emiliano Tade (born March 3, 1988) is an Argentine professional footballer who plays as a forward for Auckland City in the New Zealand Football Championship.

Tade holds the record for number of consecutive participations in the FIFA Club World Cup, appearing for Auckland City at seven consecutive FIFA Club World Cup tournaments from 2011 to 2017. He is currently the all-time leading goal scorer for Auckland City, as well as the all-time leading goal scorer in New Zealand Football Championship history; his exploits earned him a professional move to South Africa, eventually signing for league champions Mamelodi Sundowns in 2019.

Career

Early career
Born in Santiago del Estero, Tade grew up playing for boyhood side Club Atlético Mitre. Instead of pursuing a career in football, Tade was studying to become a lawyer before moving to New Zealand in April 2010. After Martín Pereyra, a fellow Argentine playing in New Zealand, suggested he trial for local semi-pro side Wellington United, Tade began a club football career.

Tade's performances in the Central Premier League impressed Team Wellington head coach Stu Jacobs, and Tade signed for the ASB Premiership club prior to the 2010–11 season, scoring six goals in 16 appearances in his debut season in the New Zealand top flight.

Auckland City
The next season, Tade sealed a move to Auckland City, joining a Hispanic contingent that included Andreu Guerao, Manel Expósito, Albert Riera, Ángel Berlanga and Luis Corrales.

Tade won the golden boot in both the 2013–14 ASB Premiership and 2013–14 OFC Champions League. He also won his first league championship that season, scoring the only goal in the final as Auckland City beat former club Team Wellington on 16 March 2014.

Due to Auckland City's dominance in the OFC Champions League, winning the competition for seven straight seasons, Tade appeared at a record seven consecutive FIFA Club World Cup competitions between 2011 and 2017. This included Auckland City's historic run in the 2014 FIFA Club World Cup, falling to Argentine giants San Lorenzo in the semifinal, before defeating Cruz Azul in the third-place playoff. His performances in the tournament earned him a move to Torneo Federal A side Club Atlético Mitre ahead of the 2015 season; however, he lasted less than a season before returning to Auckland.

South Africa

AmaZulu
On 26 May 2018, Tade confirmed that he had completed a move to Absa Premiership club AmaZulu FC following a successful trial. Tade made his debut for Usuthu in a 1−0 win over Baroka FC on 4 August 2018. He quickly began to impress during his time in South Africa, forming a strong partnership with Bongi Ntuli and becoming widely regarded as one of the most dangerous forwards in the league. After a productive first half of the season where Tade scored seven goals in all competitions and won Player of the Month honours for November and December, he drew interest from the league's larger clubs.

Mamelodi Sundowns

On 31 January 2019, reigning champions Mamelodi Sundowns announced the signing of Emiliano Tade for an undisclosed fee - believed to be around 6 million rand - which also included the permanent transfer of Bongi Ntuli, previously on loan to AmaZulu, in the other direction. Mamelodi went on to win the title that season, with Tade contributing two goals in 12 appearances for Sundowns.

His next season in South Africa was plagued by injury and personal issues; Tade failed to make an appearance for Sundowns, and eventually requested a release from his contract, citing constant injury struggles, homesickness and a wish to cease playing professionally. Tade agreed a mutual termination of contract, and he was officially released on 11 December 2019, returning to his family in New Zealand.

Return to Auckland City

On 13 January 2020, Auckland City confirmed that Tade had returned to the club alongside Tom Doyle.

Career statistics

Honours

Club
With Auckland City FC
New Zealand Football Championship (2): 2013–14, 2014–15
New Zealand National League (1): 2022
Northern League (2): 2021, 2022
Chatham Cup (1): 2022
Charity Cup (4): 2011, 2013, 2015, 2016
OFC Champions League (7): 2012, 2013, 2014, 2015, 2016, 2017, 2022
OFC President's Cup (1): 2014
FIFA Club World Cup 3rd Place: 2014

With Central United
Chatham Cup (1): 2012

Individual
Jack Batty Memorial Cup (1): 2012

References

External links

1988 births
Living people
Argentine footballers
Wellington United players
Team Wellington players
Auckland City FC players
AmaZulu F.C. players
Mamelodi Sundowns F.C. players
New Zealand Football Championship players
Association football forwards
New Zealand National League players
People from Santiago del Estero
Sportspeople from Santiago del Estero Province